The Early Pleistocene is an unofficial sub-epoch in the international geologic timescale in chronostratigraphy, being the earliest division of the Pleistocene Epoch within the ongoing Quaternary Period. It is currently estimated to span the time between 2.580 ± 0.005 Ma (million years ago) and 0.773 ± 0.005 Ma. The term Early Pleistocene applies to both the Gelasian Age (to 1.800 ± 0.005 Ma) and the Calabrian Age.

While the Gelasian and the Calabrian have officially been defined by the International Union of Geological Sciences (IUGS) to effectively constitute the Early Pleistocene, the succeeding Chibanian and Tarantian ages have yet to be ratified. These proposed ages are unofficially termed the Middle Pleistocene and Late Pleistocene respectively. The Chibanian provisionally spans time from 773 ka to 126 ka, and the Tarantian from then until the definitive end of the whole Pleistocene, c. 9700 BC in the 10th millennium BC.

Early Pleistocene and its relevance to development of the earth and humanity

Based on the Animal skeletons and radiocarbon dating, we can estimate that the Early Pleistocene occurred around 2.6 million to 0.8 million years ago. It is in the timeframe of the Pleistocene that the earth was altering its climate conditions and changing its geological environment. The Pleistocene is acknowledged as the last geological time frame that consists of global cooling, the ice-age and big glaciers in the northern hemisphere. These cooler temperature zones were covered by glaciers during the cold periods, and during the warm periods the glaciers receded. During the Pleistocene, the air was dry because of the vast amount of ice, which also caused lower sea levels and shore lines. In order to make predictions about the climate of the past paleontologists analyze Pleistocene fossil remains. The scientists also drill cores from the ice sheets to study trapped gas and microorganisms.  For example, evidence in the ocean from the Pleistocene documents a fluctuation of the Earth's temperature and ice volume. It is acknowledged that there is a period of cooling that was caused by the fluctuating heat melting glaciers into lakes and the ocean. Ultimately the melting of the ice structures disrupted the process of heat moving because cold water’s high density affects the ocean’s circulation and changes the climate. Since the melting glaciers caused sea levels to change as the glacial sheets receded and lowered the sea-level providing new connections over the continental glacial sheets. Based on animal remains we know that during the Pleistocene large mammals, mammoths and saber-toothed cats were present. However, we also know that many of the animals present at that time had new natural selection pressures that forced them into extinction. Nevertheless, species that were able to survive the cold had to evolve bodies capable of producing heat. This time period is also crucial to the evolution of humans. During the Early Pleistocene period, Human ancestral relatives known as Homo Habilis inhabited the earth in realms such as Eastern and Southern Africa. This species of Homo is characterized by having a brain around 610 cc caused by the expansion of the brain, the appearance of a slight forehead and eyebrow ridge, along with Robustus teeth that were narrower and round shoveled. Homo Habilis is important when considering the Early Pleistocene, because they were one of the earliest ancestors that linked modern humans to hominins. This part of the human genus (Homo Habilis) allowed for a connection to be made between descending relatives such as Homo rudolfensis, and Homo erectus because of primitive features retained, and adaptations that differentiate each lineage. For instance, although we know Homo Habilis is a branch on our family tree, they were also believed to be the first toolmakers. Which we know overlaps with the Early Pleistocene period, because hunting animals required advancement in tool making and strategization as the animals were much bigger in size and length. Their method of stone tool creation is known as the Oldowan tradition, where H. Habilis chipped and hammered a rock into a weapon. This also provides insight into hunting methods and the outcomes such as animal extinction which correlates with human arrival. H. Habilis living during the ice-age conditions allows us to see the phenotypic differences between successive generations and their different environments. The Pleistocene period is a significant time for ancestral development, because it allowed them to develop communication skills, the ability to think abstractly, and the specialization of stone tools. These key human evolution characteristics allowed for evolution to occur to create a successive generation known as Homo ergaster who remained alive in Africa. Where Homo Ergaster evolved into “modern humans” known as Homo sapiens. Using all of the gained past characteristics Homo Sapiens evolved a set of phenotypical and behavioral characteristics. Homo sapiens characteristics that distinguish them as the modern human are their large brains, a thick skull with developed regions such as the occipital, a vertical forehead, smaller teeth, developed brow ridges, and jaw definition not present in other species. Homo Sapiens ability to survive depended on their ability to think abstractly, and their specialization in stone tools. Homo sapien characteristics put them at a new advantage, because they allowed them to interact with each other, and their environment in different ways. These new characteristics and a new level of control over the environment allowed Homo sapiens to persist and develop into modern humans. Overall, we can see the Early Pleistocene period as being a significant time period for the development of the earth, the human species, and some animal species.

Notes

01
Pleistocene geochronology
Quaternary geochronology
Geological ages